William Nelson Ruud (born September 29, 1952) is the current and 19th president of the Marietta College. He was previously president of the University of Northern Iowa and Shippensburg University of Pennsylvania.

Dr. Ruud received his bachelor's degree in public administration and hospital administration from the University of North Dakota. While at the University of North Dakota, Dr. Ruud was a member of the Kappa Sigma fraternity.  He received his master's degree and his doctorate in organizational behavior from the University of Nebraska at Lincoln.

Ruud began teaching at the University of Toledo in 1981, and went on to become dean of the College of Business and Economics at Boise State University in 1993, and later the vice president for institutional advancement. Beginning in 2004, Ruud next served as professor of management, policy, and strategy at California State University at Stanislaus, and served two years as vice president for development and university relations. In  February 2007, he became president of Shippensburg University of Pennsylvania. On February 7, 2013, it was announced Ruud would be the 10th president of the University of Northern Iowa. He assumed the position on May 31, 2013. Ruud was formally installed as president in a ceremony on October 4, 2013, in the Gallagher-Bluedorn Performing Arts Center.

On May 18, 2016, it was announced that Ruud would leave the University of Northern Iowa to become president of Marietta College, effective July 3.

On February 20, 2023, Ruud announced his departure from Marietta College, effective on or before June 30, 2023.

References

External links
Marietta College bio
Northern Iowa bio
Shippensburg bio
 http://news2.marietta.edu/node/13356

1952 births
University of North Dakota alumni
Marietta College
Shippensburg University of Pennsylvania
University of Nebraska–Lincoln alumni
Heads of universities and colleges in the United States
Living people
University of Toledo faculty
Boise State University faculty
California State University, Stanislaus faculty